Humphreys Peak is the highest natural point and the second most prominent peak after Mount Graham in the U.S. state of Arizona, with an elevation of  and is located within the Kachina Peaks Wilderness in the Coconino National Forest, about  north of Flagstaff, Arizona. Humphreys Peak is the highest of a group of dormant volcanic peaks known as the San Francisco Peaks.

Humphreys Peak was named in about 1870 for General Andrew A. Humphreys, a U.S. Army officer who was a Union general during the American Civil War, and who later became Chief of Engineers of the United States Army Corps of Engineers. However, a General Land Office map from 1903 showed the name San Francisco Peak applied to this feature (apparently borrowed from San Francisco Mountain on which the peak stands). Thus the United States Board on Geographic Names approved the variant name in 1911. In 1933, the application of the names was rectified.

See also
 List of U.S. states by elevation
 List of Ultras of the United States
 List of mountains and hills of Arizona by height
 San Francisco Peaks

References

External links
 
 
 
 "Kachina Trail #150". U.S. Forest Service.
 "Humphreys Peak Trail #151." HikeArizona.com.
 "Kachina Peaks Wilderness." U.S. Forest Service.

Landforms of Coconino County, Arizona
Mountains of Arizona
Volcanoes of Arizona
Extinct volcanoes
Highest points of U.S. states
Coconino National Forest
North American 3000 m summits
Mountains of Coconino County, Arizona